Piscola is an unincorporated community in Brooks County, in the U.S. state of Georgia.

History
The community takes its name from nearby Piscola Creek.

References

Unincorporated communities in Thomas County, Georgia